The 1988 Irish Professional Championship was a professional invitational snooker tournament, which took place between 9 and 12 February 1988 at the Antrim Forum in Antrim, Northern Ireland.

Jack McLaughlin won the title beating Dennis Taylor 9–4 in the final.

Main draw

References

Irish Professional Championship
Irish Professional Championship
Irish Professional Championship
Irish Professional Championship